Selda Alkor (born January 3, 1943) is a Turkish actress, beauty pageant titleholder, painter, and singer of Circassian and Georgian descent. She received a Golden Orange in 2002. Her acting skills and European features made her one of the most in-demand Turkish actresses in the early 1970s. With marked Circassian characteristics, Alkor was famous for her tall height, natural blonde hair, fair skin, and light green eyes. Due to her portrayal of Sümbül Karadağ on the primetime ATV series Asmalı Konak, she was nicknamed "Hanım Ağa", old Turkish for matriarch. Alkor served as presidents of various foundations, including TÜRKSAV and SODER.

Early life and career
Alkor was born in 1943 to Muharrem and Meliha Alkor. An ethnic Circassian, her father was a well-known police commissioner and author in Turkey. Her mother was a housewife whose mother was of Georgian origin. Selda Alkor's resemblance to her paternal grandfather, Çerkez Sarı Mehmet (Turkish: Mehmet the Circassian Blond), was remarkable. She spent a vast majority of her childhood in Manisa. Alkor attended high schools for girls both in İzmir and Manisa. Later, she graduated from the Art Institute. In 1965, she finished first in a beauty competition organized by the Ses magazine and held the title Miss Cinema Star. Alkor also released several LP records.

Discography

LPs
 "Bay Fakir"
 "Yarın Yeni Bir Gün Olacak"

Singles
 "Duydum ki Unutmuşsun"
 "Senede Bir Gün"
 "Şaka Yaptım Anlasana" (1970)

Filmography

Film

Television

References

External links
 

1943 births
Living people
Turkish film actresses
Turkish television actresses
Turkish women singers
Turkish people of Circassian descent
Turkish people of Georgian descent